Howth is a village and outer suburb of Dublin, Ireland.

Howth may also refer to:

 Howth, Tasmania, a locality in Tasmania, Australia

See also